Sakha Republic is a federal subject of Russia.

Sakha may also refer to:
 Sakha language, or Yakut, a Turkic language
 Sakha people, also Yakuts, a Turkic people
 Sakha scripts, writing systems for the Sakha language
 Xois, a town in Egypt also known as Sakha
 Sakha, Iran, a village in Zanjan Province, Iran
 Sakha Consulting Wings, a taxi service provided by women for women in Delhi, India

See also 
 Saha (disambiguation)
 Saka (disambiguation)